Jacques Fornier (6 November 1926 – 14 November 2020) was a French theatrical actor and director. He founded the Théâtre de Bourgogne and led it for 15 years. He also directed the National Theatre of Strasbourg. Since 1985, the show Salle Jacques Fornier has been shown in Dijon.

Biography
Fornier started his career in Paris before moving to Beaune in Burgundy. In 1956, he founded the Troupe de Bourgogne, which featured 11 actors, including Roland Bertin. In 1959, the French Government began to fund the troupe, which would become the Centre dramatique national. In 1971, he became the Director of the National Theatre of Strasbourg, a position he held for one year.

Jacques Fornier died on 14 November 2020 at the age of 94.

Staging
Le Légetaire universel (1957)
Les Deux Ogres (1958)
Le Médecin malgré lui (1959)
The Barber of Seville (1959)
Le Mariage forcé (1960)
La Fausse Suivante (1960)
Barberine (1960)
La Fontaine aux saints (1960)
The Miser (1961)
Julius Caesar (1962)
Éduoard et Agrippine (1963)
La Manivelle (1964)
La Folle Journée (1967)
La Mort joyeuse
The Bear
Feu la mère de Madame
Soledad
No Exit 
Scapin the Schemer
The Mandrake
On ne badine pas avec l'amour
Le Déluge
Creditors
Turcaret
Phèdre~Epilogue (2011)

Acting
La Tragédie du roi Christophe (1997)
Aberrations du documentaliste (1998-1999)
La Porte d'harmonie (1999)
Phèdre (2001-2003)
Micromégas (2003)
Aberrations du documentaliste (2006)
La Confrérie des farceurs (2007)
Britannicus (2008)
Aberrations du documentaliste (2009)

Filmography

Cinema
Je suis un no man's land (2011)

Television
Kir, la légende et son double (2012)

Awards
Commander of the Ordre des Arts et des Lettres (1993)

References

1926 births
2020 deaths
20th-century French actors
21st-century French actors
French male stage actors
French male film actors
French male television actors
Theatre directors from Paris
Male actors from Paris